One Love is the second studio album by English boy band Blue, released on 4 November 2002 in the United Kingdom and on 21 October 2003 in the United States. The album peaked at number one on the UK Albums Chart, where it stayed for one week. On 20 December 2003 it was certified 4× Platinum in the UK.

Three singles were released from the album: "One Love", which peaked at number three, "Sorry Seems to Be the Hardest Word", featuring Elton John, which peaked at number one, and "U Make Me Wanna", which peaked at number four.

Singles 
 "One Love" — The debut single, released in October 2002. The single peaked at No. 3 on the UK Singles Chart, No. 36 on the Australian Top 40, at No. 5 in New Zealand and No. 4 in Ireland. The song has received a Silver sales status certification for sales of over 200,000 copies in the UK.
 "Sorry Seems to Be the Hardest Word" — The second single, released in December 2002, featuring guest vocals from Elton John. The song is a cover version of Elton's number one hit. The single peaked at No. 1 on the UK Singles Chart, No. 43 on the Australian Top 100, No. 5 in New Zealand and No. 3 in Ireland. The song has received a Gold sales status certification for sales of over 500,000 copies in the UK.
 "U Make Me Wanna" — The third single, released in March 2003. The single peaked at No. 4 on the UK Singles Chart. The song was produced by multi-platinum producers StarGate & co-written by Steve Robson, John McLaughlin and Tom Wilkins. The song has sales of over 100,000 copies in the UK.
 "Supersexual" — Released as a single exclusively in Spain and South America in May 2003. The single peaked at No. 3 on the Spanish Singles Chart, becoming one of Blue's most successful singles in the region. A music video was recorded, featuring footage from the group's One Love tour.

Critical reception

The Guardian critic Caroline Sullivan called the album "a decent showing from one of the less idiotic boy bands. She found that Blue's previous album All Rise "was such a sterling example of what thoughtful production can achieve in the boy-band genre that they can be excused for duplicating it across this album. The strategy essentially pays off, though half a dozen of the 15 tracks [...] could have been left on the cutting-room floor. Things amble along in a satisfyingly low-key way, with as much attention lavished on strong, soulful harmonies as laid-back R&B trimmings." Sharon Mawer from AllMusic rated the album three stars out of five.

Track listing

Notes
 The Japanese Deluxe Edition comes with a bonus DVD of the One Love Live Tour.
  signifies a co-producer
  signifies an additional producer

Tour

Charts

Weekly charts

Year-end charts

Decade-end charts

Certifications and sales

Trivia
In 2004, the "Invitation" song was used as a TV commercial theme song for the Aqua drinking product Aqua Splash of Fruit, produced by Aqua Danone in Indonesia.

References

2002 albums
Blue (English band) albums
Albums produced by Stargate
Albums produced by Cutfather